Nancy White may refer to:

 Nancy White (editor) (1916–2002), editor of Harper's Bazaar
 Nancy White (field hockey), American former field hockey player
 Nancy White (singer-songwriter), Canadian singer-songwriter
 Nancy Metz White (1934–2018), American artist